Angelo Augusto Perugini (6 April 1955 in Jacutinga, Minas Gerais – 1 April 2021 in São Paulo) was a Brazilian politician.

Life
He served as Mayor of Hortolândia and was a member of the Legislative Assembly of São Paulo.

References

Members of the Legislative Assembly of São Paulo
1955 births
2021 deaths
Deaths from the COVID-19 pandemic in São Paulo (state)